In Walked Mary is a 1920 American silent drama film directed by George Archainbaud and starring June Caprice, Thomas Carrigan and Stanley Walpole.

Cast
 June Caprice as Mary Ann Hubbard 
 Thomas Carrigan as Dick Allison 
 Stanley Walpole as Wilbur Darcey 
 Vivienne Osborne as Betsy Caldwell 
 Frances Miller as Mammy

Preservation status
The film is preserved in the Library of Congress.

References

Bibliography
 Christine Leteux. Albert Capellani: Pioneer of the Silent Screen. University Press of Kentucky, 2015.

External links

1920 films
1920 drama films
Silent American drama films
Films directed by George Archainbaud
American silent feature films
1920s English-language films
Pathé Exchange films
American black-and-white films
1920s American films